Milada is a female given name. Diminutive of Slavic names beginning with the element mil meaning gracious, young. Pronounced MI-lah-dah.

Name Days 
Czech: 8 February
Slovak: 29 December
Slovene: 28 March

Famous bearers 
Milada Horáková, Czechoslovak politician, executed after a show-trial in 1950
Milada Marešová, Czech painter
Milada Fišerová, Czech model
Milada Ježková, Czech actress
Milada Karasová, holder of Czechoslovak Models
Milada Emmerová, Czech doctor and politician ČSSD
Milada Gabrielová, Czech painter
Milada Součková, Czech writer
Milada Šubrtová, Czech opera singer
Milada Karbanová, Czech athlete

See also 
Mila (given name)
Milan (given name)
Milena (name)
Miloslav

Slavic feminine given names
Czech feminine given names
Slovak feminine given names